The Very One Stakes is an American Thoroughbred horse race run annually at Pimlico Race Course in Baltimore, Maryland. Open to fillies and mares three years old and up, it is contested over a distance of five furlongs on turf.

The Very One Stakes is run on the third Friday of May each year on the Black-Eyed Susan Stakes under card. The race is run on the "Filly Friday" of Preakness Stakes weekend. The race was not run between 1994 and 2000. The first year the race was run in 1993, it was contested at  miles on the main track at "Old Hilltop" on a dirt surface; since that time it has been run at a distance of five furlongs and on the turf.

The Very One Stakes attracts female turf sprinters. It was named in honor of The Very One, one of the best race mares in training during the late 1970s and early 1980s. Purchased out of the 1977 two-year-old in training sale at Timonium for $22,000, she became a millionaire, racing in 71 times with a record of 22 wins, 12 second-place finishes and 18 third-place finishes and earnings of $1,030,120. Her most famous wins came in the grade one Santa Barbara Handicap in California and the grade two Dixie Stakes at Pimlico Race Course in Baltimore, Maryland, over the best turf males in the country in 1979.

The Very One Stakes is the lead off leg of the Mid Atlantic Thoroughbred Championships Fillies and Mares Sprint Turf Division or MATCh Races.  MATCh is a series of five races in five separate thoroughbred divisions run throughout four Mid-Atlantic States including; Pimlico Race Course and Laurel Park Racecourse in Maryland; Delaware Park Racetrack in Delaware; Parx, Philadelphia Park and Presque Isle Downs in Pennsylvania and Monmouth Park in New Jersey.

Records 
Speed record: 
 5 furlongs - 55.60 - Unbridled Sidney  (2007)

Most wins by a jockey:
 2 - Ramon Dominguez (2001 & 2002)
 2 - Edgar Prado (1993 & 2005)
 2 - Javier Castellano (2006, 2017)

Most wins by a trainer:
 3 - Kathleen DeMasi (2002, 2004, 2017)

Most wins by an owner:
 2 - Darley Stables (2003 & 2009)

Winners of The Very One Stakes since 1993

See also 
 The Very One Stakes top three finishers
 Pimlico Race Course
 List of graded stakes at Pimlico Race Course

References 

Turf races in the United States
1993 establishments in Maryland
Ungraded stakes races in the United States
Sports competitions in Baltimore
Pimlico Race Course
Horse races in Maryland
Recurring sporting events established in 1993